Roepkiella subfuscus is a moth in the family Cossidae. It is found on Java and Sumatra and in Vietnam.

References

Natural History Museum Lepidoptera generic names catalog

Cossinae